Jairo is a common Spanish name. Notable people with this name include:

People

Association football
Francisco Jairo Silva Santos (born 1988), Brazilian footballer
Jairo Aguirre (born 1956), Colombian footballer
Jairo Álvarez Gutiérrez (born 1986), Spanish footballer
Jairo Ampudia (born 1966), Colombian footballer
Jairo Arboleda (born 1947), Colombian footballer
Jairo Arias (born 1938), Colombian footballer
Jairo Arreola (born 1985), Guatemalan footballer
Jairo Arrieta (born 1983), Costa Rican footballer
Jairo Luis Blumer (born 1986), Brazilian footballer
Jairo Campos (born 1984), Ecuadorian footballer
Jairo Castillo (born 1977), Colombian footballer
Jairo Henríquez (born 1993), Salvadorian footballer
Jairo Jiménez (born 1993), Panamanian footballer
Jairo de Macedo da Silva (born 1992), Brazilian footballer
Jairo Montaño (born 1979), Ecuadorian footballer
Jairo Martínez (born 1978), Honduran footballer
Jairo do Nascimento (1946–2019), Brazilian footballer
Jairo Neto (born 1994), Brazilian/East Timorese footballer
Jairo Palomino (born 1988), Colombian footballer
Jairo Patiño (born 1978), Colombian footballer
Jairo Pérez (born 1976), Guatemalan footballer
Jairo Puerto (born 1988), Honduran footballer
Jaïro Riedewald (born 1996), Dutch footballer
Jairo Samperio (born 1993), Spanish footballer
Jairo Sanchez-Scott (born 1987), Cayman Islands footballer
Jairo Suárez (born 1985), Colombian footballer
John Jairo Castillo (born 1984), Colombian footballer
John Jairo Culma (born 1981), Colombian footballer
John Jairo Ruiz (born 1994), Costa Rican footballer
John Jairo Tréllez (born 1968), Colombian footballer
John Jairo Ulloque (born 1986), Colombian footballer
Juan Jairo Galeano (born 1962), Colombian footballer

Other
Jairo (born 1949), Argentine singer
Jairo Clopatofsky (born 1961), Colombian politician
Jairo Cossio (born 1970), Colombian weightlifter
Jairo Duzant (born 1979), sprinter from the Netherlands Antilles
Jairo Guedz, lead guitar player of Brazilian heavy metal band Sepultura
Jairo Hernández (born 1972), Colombian cyclist
Jairo Labourt (born 1994), Dominican baseball pitcher
Jairo Miguel (born 1993), Spanish bullfighter
Jairo Penaranda (born 1958), American football running back
Jairo Pérez (born 1973), Colombian track and road cyclist
Jairo Salas (born 1984), Colombian road cyclist
Jairo Varela (born 1949), Colombian musician, composer and songwriter of Salsa music and other tropical genres

Spanish masculine given names